Guðrún Ósk Ámundadóttir (born 7 May 1987) is an Icelandic basketball coach and a former member of the Icelandic national basketball team. As a player, she won the national championship twice and the Icelandic Cup five times.

Club career
After coming up through the junior programs of Skallagrímur, Guðrún started her senior team career with Haukar in 2003 and helped the team win two national championships and five Icelandic Cups. She played for KR from 2007 to 2009, winning the Icelandic Cup during her later season with the team.

She returned to her hometown team of Skallagrímur in 2015. In her first game, she posted a triple-double with 10 points, 10 rebounds and 11 assists. In 2017 she helped Skallagrímur to the Cup finals where it eventually lost to Valur. She retired from playing after being hired as the head coach of Skallagrímur in September 2019.

Titles
Icelandic champion (2): 2006, 2007
Icelandic Cup (5): 2005, 2007, 2009, 2010, 2014
Icelandic Company Cup (3): 2005, 2006, 2011
Icelandic Super Cup: 2006
1. deild kvenna (2) : 2004, 2016

National team career
Guðrún played in nine games for the Icelandic national basketball team from 2008 to 2009.

Coaching career
After serving as an assistant coach to Biljana Stanković for the 2018–19 season, she was hired as the head coach of Skallagrímur in September 2019. In February 2020, she guided Skallagrímur to its first major title since 1964 when the team defeated KR in the Icelandic Cup finals. In the Úrvalsdeild, the team posted á 15–10 record before the rest of the season was canceled due to the coronavirus pandemic in Iceland.

In May 2020, she signed a contract extension for the 2020-21 season.On 20 September 2020, she guided Skallagrímur to its first victory in the Icelandic Super Cup by defeating Valur 74–68. She resigned from her post as head coach on 1 July 2021.

Titles
Icelandic Cup: 2020
Icelandic Super Cup: 2020

Personal life
Guðrún is the sister of basketball players Sigrún Sjöfn Ámundadóttir and Arna Hrönn Ámundadóttir.

References

External links
Basketball statistics 2008-present at Icelandic Basketball Association

1987 births
Living people
Guards (basketball)
Gudrun Osk Amundadottir
Gudrun Osk Amundadottir
Gudrun Osk Amundadottir
Gudrun Osk Amundadottir
Gudrun Osk Amundadottir
Gudrun Osk Amundadottir
Gudrun Osk Amundadottir
Gudrun Osk Amundadottir